William Jennings, S.T.D. previously Prior of St Oswald's Priory, Gloucester, was the first Dean of Gloucester, serving from 1541 until his death on 4 November 1565: he was buried at Gloucester Cathedral.

References

16th-century English Anglican priests
Deans of Gloucester
English priors
Year of birth missing
1565 deaths
Burials at Gloucester Cathedral